Richard Newland is a British horse trainer and former general practitioner, whose horse Pineau De Re won the 2014 Grand National. He lives in Worcestershire with his wife Laura and three daughters Amelia, Felicity and Annabelle. <ref></ref

References

Year of birth missing (living people)
Living people
20th-century English medical doctors
21st-century English medical doctors
British racehorse trainers
Medical doctors from Worcestershire